Edward Mulcock (6 July 1909 – 15 July 1994) was a New Zealand cricketer. He played first-class cricket for Canterbury and Otago between 1936 and 1944.

A medium-paced swing bowler, Mulcock became the third bowler to take a hat-trick in the Plunket Shield when he took 8 for 61 for Canterbury in Otago's second innings in December 1937. In the next match, which followed a few days later, he took 6 for 53 in Wellington's first innings. Nevertheless, Canterbury lost both matches.

See also
 List of Otago representative cricketers

References

External links
 

1909 births
1994 deaths
New Zealand cricketers
Canterbury cricketers
Otago cricketers
Cricketers from Christchurch
South Island Army cricketers